Nationality words link to articles with information on the nation's poetry or literature (for instance, Irish or France).

Events
 April – Wallace Stevens is baptized a Catholic by the chaplain of St. Francis Hospital in Hartford, Connecticut, where Stevens spends his last days suffering from terminal cancer. After a brief release from the hospital, Stevens is readmitted and dies on August 2 at the age of 76.
 July 30 – Philip Larkin makes a train journey in England from Hull to Grantham which inspires his poem The Whitsun Weddings. His collection The Less Deceived is published in November (dated October).
 The Group, a British poetry movement, starts meeting in London with gatherings taking place once a week, on Friday evenings, at first at Philip Hobsbaum's flat and later at the house of Edward Lucie-Smith. The poets gather to discuss each other's work, putting into practice the sort of analysis and objective comment in keeping with the principles of Hobsbaum's Cambridge tutor F. R. Leavis and of the New Criticism in general. Before each meeting about six or seven poems by one poet are typed, duplicated and distributed to the dozen or so participants.
 The Movement poets as a group in Britain come to public notice this year in Robert Conquest's anthology New Lines. The core of the group consists of Philip Larkin, Elizabeth Jennings, D. J. Enright, Kingsley Amis, Thom Gunn and Donald Davie. They are identified with a hostility to modernism and internationalism, and look to Thomas Hardy as a model. However, both Davie and Gunn later move away from this position.
 Henry Rago becomes editor of Poetry magazine in the United States.

Beat poets
 July 19 – Beat poet Weldon Kees's Plymouth Savoy is found on the north side of the Golden Gate Bridge in San Francisco with the keys in the ignition. When his friends go to search his apartment, all they find are the cat he had named Lonesome and a pair of red socks in the sink. His sleeping bag and savings account book are missing. He has left no note. No one is sure if Kees, 41, jumped off the bridge that day or if he went to Mexico. Before his disappearance, Kees quoted Rilke to friend Michael Grieg, ominously saying that sometimes a person needs to change his life completely.
 October 7 – The "Six Gallery reading" takes place in San Francisco with Kenneth Rexroth acting as M.C., Philip Lamantia, Michael McClure, Gary Snyder, and Philip Whalen read, and the event includes Allen Ginsberg's first reading of Howl (written the previous summer at Ginsberg's cottage in Berkeley, California); the reading (1) brings together the East and West Coast factions of the Beat Generation, (2) is the first important public manifestation of the poetry movement and (3) helps to herald the West Coast literary revolution that becomes known as the San Francisco Renaissance. In the audience a totally drunken Jack Kerouac refuses to read his own work but cheers on the others, shouting "Yeah! Go! Go!" during their performances.

Works published in English
Listed by nation where the work was first published and again by the poet's native land, if different; substantially revised works listed separately:

Canada
 Eldon Grier, A Morning from Scraps
 Irving Layton, The Blue Propeller. Toronto: Contact Press.
 Irving Layton, The Cold Green Element. Toronto: Contact Press.
 Dorothy Livesay, New Poems. Toronto: Emblem Books.
 Sir Charles G.D. Roberts, Selected Poems, edited by Desmond Pacey, posthumously published
 Raymond Souster, For What Time Slays. Toronto: Contact Press.
 Miriam Waddington, The Second Silence
 Wilfred Watson, Friday's Child
 Anne Wilkinson, The Hangman Ties the Holly

New Zealand
 James K. Baxter:
 The Fire and the Anvil, critical study, based on three Macmillan Brown lectures on poetry at Victoria University in 1954, criticism
 Traveller’s Litany, a long poem published in pamphlet form
 J. R. Hervey, She Was My Spring
 Kendrick Smithyman, The Gay Trapeze, Wellington: Handcraft Press

United Kingdom
 W. H. Auden, The Shield of Achilles, first published in the United States
 Austin Clarke, Ancient Lights
 Robert Conquest, Poems
 Patric Dickinson, The Scale of Things
 W. S. Graham, The Nightfishing
 Robert Graves, Collected Poems 1955, revisions and reprintings of previously published poems; among eight books of poetry included in "A List of 250 Outstanding Books of the Year" in The New York Times Book Review
 Elizabeth Jennings, A Way of Looking
 Philip Larkin, The Less Deceived, Hessle, East Yorkshire: Marvell Press
 Norman MacCaig, Riding Lights
 Hugh MacDiarmid, pen name of Christopher Murray Grieve, In Memoriam James Joyce
 Edith Anne Robertson, Poems Frae the Suddron
 Iain Crichton Smith, The Long River
 Stephen Spender, Collected Poems, 1928–1953, what he considers his best poems, selected and revised; among eight books of poetry included in "A List of 250 Outstanding Books of the Year" in The New York Times Book Review
 R. S. Thomas, Song at the Year's Turning, introduction by John Betjeman
 Charles Tomlinson, The Necklace

United States

 A.R. Ammons, Ommateum with Doxology, his first book
 W. H. Auden, The Shield of Achilles, a book of 28 pastoral and devotional poems (his poem of the same name was first published in 1953); among eight books of poetry included in "A List of 250 Outstanding Books of the Year" in The New York Times Book Review.
 Elizabeth Bishop, Poems: North & South — A Cold Spring, (Houghton Mifflin); among eight books of poetry included in "A List of 250 Outstanding Books of the Year" in The New York Times Book Review.
 Paul Blackburn, The Dissolving Fabric, Highlands, North Carolina: The Divers Press
 Kenneth Burke, Book of Monuments: Poems 1915–1954
 John Ciardi, As If
 Robert P. Tristram Coffin, Selected Poems, among eight books of poetry included in "A List of 250 Outstanding Books of the Year" in The New York Times Book Review.
 Gregory Corso, The Vestal Lady on Brattle and Other Poems
 Louis Coxe, The Second Man
 Emily Dickinson, The Complete Poems, three volumes
 Robert Creeley, All That is Lovely in Man
 Emily Dickinson, The Poems of Emily Dickinson, three volumes, edited by Thomas H. Johnson; a "definitive edition of the Dickinson poems with variant readings critically compared," according to the New York Times Book Review, which listed it among eight books of poetry included in "A List of 250 Outstanding Books of the Year".
 Lawrence Ferlinghetti, Pictures of the Gone World
 Isabella Gardner, Birthdays from the Ocean, her first collection; among eight books of poetry included in "A List of 250 Outstanding Books of the Year" in The New York Times Book Review.
 William Graham (poet), The Nightfishing
 Donald Hall, Exiles and Marriages
 Robert Hughes, Collected Poems
 Randall Jarrell, Selected Poems
 Josephine Miles, Prefabrications
 Howard Nemerov, The Salt Garden
 John Crowe Ransom, Poems and Essays
 Adrienne Rich, The Diamond Cutters and Other Poems
 Louis Simpson, Good News of Death
 William Carlos Williams, Journey to Love

Criticism, scholarship, and biography in the United States
 Carl Sandburg, Prairie-town boy (autobiography; essentially excerpts from Always the Young Strangers)

Other in English
 A. D. Hope, The Wandering Islands (Australia)
 D. Stewart and N. Keesing, editors, Australian Bush Ballads, anthology (Australia)

Works published in other languages

France
 Guillaume Apollinaire, pen name of Wilhelm Apollinaris de Kostrowitzky,  Poèmes à Lou, (a revised edition of Ombre de mon amour, published by P. Cailler Vesenaz 1947), posthumously published (died 1918)
 Pierre Oster, Le Champ de mai
 Jacques Prévert, La Pluie et le beau temps
 Roger-Arnould Rivière, L'Équerre
 Victor Segalen, Stèles, Peintures, Équipée (see also Stèles 1912)
 Jean Tortel, Naissance de l'objet
 Tristan Tzara, pen name of Sami Rosenstock, Le temps naissant
 Tchicaya U Tam'si, Mauvais sang

India
Listed in alphabetical order by first name:

Gujarati
 Balumukund Dave, Parikrama, Gujarati
 Natvarlal Kuberdas Pandya, Prasun, the author's first collection of poems
 Ramnarayan Vishvanath Pathak, Brhat Pingal, a study of the history and structure of Gujarati prosody
 Venibhai Purohit, Sinjarav, the author's first collection of poems

Oriya
 Krushnachandra Tripathy, Ahuti
 Mohan Upendra Thakur, Phuldali
 Narendranath Misra, Balarama Dasa O Oriya Ramayana, critical study of Balaram Das, the 15th-century poet-saint and author of the most popular Ramayana in the Oriya language

Other languages of the Indian subcontinent
 Amrita Pritam, Sunehure, Punjabi
 Birendra Chattopadhyay, Ulukhagdar Kabita, Bengali
 C. Narayanan Nair, translator, Kannaki-Kovalam, translation into Sanskrit from the Silappadikaram, a Tamil-language poem
 Dina Nath Walli, also known as "Almast", Bala Yepari, lyrics on rural themes, mostly in the vatsun form; Kashmiri
 Hitanarayan Jha, Kavivar Canda Jha O Wordsworthak prakrtiprem, a comparative study of Chanda Jha and William Wordsworth's love of nature; Maithili
 Jaswant Singh Neki, Asle Te Ohle, Punjabi
 Kalachand Shastri Chingorgban, Manipuri Mahabharat, translation into Meitei from the Sanskrit Mahabharat, in 20 volumes, published from this year to 1980
 Krishnakanta Mishra, Maithili Sahityak Itihas, history of Maithili literature
 Lekhraj Aziz, Gul Va Khar, study of prosody and the rules of Islamic meters, including examples from various works by modern Sindhi poets
 Ram Nath Shastri, translator, Niti Sataka, translation into Dogri from the Sanskrit poems of Bhartrihari
 Sri Naunram Samskarta, Dasa dev, Rajasthani
 Sudhindranath Datta, translator, Pratidhvani, translation into Bengali from English, French and German poems, including verses by Shakespeare, Mallarme and Heine
 V. R. M. Chettiyar, Kavinan Kural, literary essays on Percy Bysshe Shelley, Ralph Waldo Emerson, William Shakespeare, William Wordsworth, Bharatidasan, Mutiyaracan among others; Tamil

Other languages
 Simin Behbahani, Chelcheragh ("Chandelier"), Persia
 Alberto de Lacerda, 77 Poems, Portuguese poet published in English, translations by poet and Arthur Waley
 Delia Domínguez, Simbólico retorno, Chile
 H. E. Holthusen and F. Kemp, editors, Ergriffenes Dasein: deutsche Lyrik 1900-1950, anthology, Germany
 Henryk Jasiczek, Poland
 Alexander Mezhirov, Возвращение ("Return"), Soviet Union
 Giorgos Seferis, Ημερολόγιο Καταστρώματος ΙΙΙ ("Deck Diary III"), Greece
 Yoshioka Minoru, 静物 ("Still Life"), Japan

Awards and honors
 Frost Medal: Leona Speyer
 National Book Award for Poetry: Wallace Stevens, The Collected Poems
 Pulitzer Prize for Poetry: Wallace Stevens: Collected Poems
 Queen's Gold Medal for Poetry: Ruth Pitter
 Bollingen Prize: Léonie Adams and Louise Bogan
 Fellowship of the Academy of American Poets: Rolfe Humphries
 Canada: Governor General's Award, poetry or drama: Friday's Child, Wilfred Watson
 Vachel Lindsay Prize (Poetry (magazine)): Violet Ranney Lang

Births
Death years link to the corresponding "[year] in poetry" article:
 January 1 – Mir Tanha Yousafi (died 2019), Pakistani Punjabi and Urdu writer
 January 16 – Mary Karr, American poet and memoirist
 February 2 – Leszek Engelking, Polish poet
 February 22 – Yang Lian 杨炼, Swiss-born Chinese poet associated with the Misty Poets
 March 19 – John Burnside, Scottish poet and fiction writer
 March 27 – Lisa Zeidner, American poet
 April 4 – Margaret Lindsay Holton, Canadian designer and writer
 April 17 – Erín Moure, Canadian poet
 April 22 – Marie Uguay (died 1981), French-Canadian poet
 May 13 – Mark Abley,  Canadian poet, journalist, editor and non-fiction writer
 July 5
 Sebastian Barry, Irish novelist, playwright and poet
 Mia Couto (António Emílio Leite Couto), Mozambican Portuguese-language fiction writer and poet
 July 6 – William Wall, Irish novelist, poet and short story writer
 July 12 – Robin Robertson, Scottish-born poet, novelist and editor
 June 15 – Les Wicks, Australian poet
 June 25 – Patricia Smith, African-American poet, "spoken-word performer", playwright, author and writing teacher
 September 13 – Hiromi Itō, Japanese poet
 October 19 – Jason Shinder (died 2008), American poet, editor, anthologist and teacher, founder of Y.M.C.A. National Writer’s Voice program, one of the country’s largest networks of literary-arts centers, at one time an assistant to Allen Ginsberg
 October 26 – Michelle Boisseau (died 2017), American poet
 December 23 – Carol Ann Duffy, Scottish poet
 Also:
 Marilyn Chin, American poet
 Chris Edwards, Australian poet
 Paula Green, New Zealand poet
 Jennifer Harrison, Australian psychiatrist, poet and photographer
 Paula Meehan, Irish poet
 Kim Morrissey, Canadian poet and playwright
 Wang Xiaoni, Chinese poet
 Dean Young, American poet
 Ouyang Yu, Australian poet, novelist, writer, translator and academic

Deaths
Birth years link to the corresponding "[year] in poetry" article:
 January 1 – Mizuho Ōta 太田水穂, pen-name of Teiichi Ōta 太田 貞, occasionally also using alternative pen name "Mizuhonoya", 78 (born 1876), Shōwa period Japanese poet and literary scholar (surname: Ōta)
 January 19 – Kenneth Mackenzie, writing fiction as Seaforth Mackenzie, 41 (born 1913), Australian poet and novelist (accidental drowning)
 January 20 – Robert P. Tristram Coffin, 62 (born 1892), American poet, essayist and novelist
 March 10 – Brian Vrepont (born 1882), Australian poet
 June 19 – Adrienne Monnier, 63 (born 1892), French poet and publisher
 July 18 – Weldon Kees, 41 (born 1914), American poet, critic, novelist, short story writer, painter and composer (presumed dead – see "Events" section)
 August 2 – Wallace Stevens, 75 (born 1879), American poet
 November 12 – Tin Ujević, 64 (born 1891), Croatian poet
 December 30 – Rex Ingamells, 42 (born 1913), Australian poet influential in the Jindyworobak Movement (automobile accident)

See also

 Poetry
 List of poetry awards
 List of years in poetry

Notes

20th-century poetry
Poetry